Rene Kramer (born October 24, 1987) is a German professional ice hockey defenceman. He is currently playing for the Dresdner Eislöwen of the DEL2. He has previously played in the Deutsche Eishockey Liga with the Straubing Tigers after he was previously with the DEG Metro Stars.

References

External links

1987 births
Living people
Eisbären Berlin players
DEG Metro Stars players
Dresdner Eislöwen players
Kassel Huskies players
EHC München players
German ice hockey defencemen
Straubing Tigers players